Wrestling competitions at the 2023 Pan American Games in Santiago, Chile are scheduled to be held between November 1 and 4, 2023 at the Choose Healthy Living Center in La Reina.

The competition is split into two disciplines, Freestyle and Greco-Roman which were further divided into different weight categories. Men competed in both disciplines whereas women only took part in the freestyle events, with 18 gold medals awarded (12 for men and six for women). Wrestling has been contested at every Pan American Games.

Qualification

A total of 168 wrestlers will qualify to compete at the games. The winner of each weight category at the 2021 Junior Pan American Games in Cali, Colombia qualified directly, along with the top four at the 2022 Pan American Wrestling Championships and 2023 Pan American Wrestling Championships. The host country (Chile) is guaranteed a spot in each event, but its athletes must compete in both the 2022 and 2023 Pan American Championship. If Chile does not qualify at any of the first two events, it will take the fourth spot available at the 2023 Pan American Championships. A further six wildcards (four men and two women) will be awarded to nations without any qualified athlete but took part in the qualification tournaments.

Participating nations
A total of 16 countries qualified athletes so far.

Medalists

Men's events
Freestyle

Greco-Roman

Women's events
Freestyle

See also
Wrestling at the 2024 Summer Olympics

References

 
Wrestling
Pan American Games
2023
International wrestling competitions hosted by Chile